Abdelmalek Sellal (born 1 August 1948) is an Algerian politician who was Prime Minister of Algeria from 3 September 2012 to 13 March 2014 when he took a leave of office to support President Abdelaziz Bouteflika's re-election campaign and again from April 2014 to May 2017.

Life and career
Sellal was born on 1 August 1948 in Constantine, Algeria.

Sellal worked at the Ministry of Foreign Affairs from 1995 to 1996 and was posted in Budapest as Ambassador to Hungary from 1996 to 1997. Subsequently, he was appointed to the government, serving as Minister of the Interior from 1998 to 1999, Minister of Youth and Sports from 1999 to 2001, Minister of Public Works from 2001 to 2002, Minister of Transport from 2002 to 2004, and Minister of Water Resources from 2004 to 2012.

Sellal was appointed as Prime Minister by President Abdelaziz Bouteflika on 3 September 2012. Sellal is regarded as a technocrat and was involved in Bouteflika's presidential election campaigns in 2004 and 2009. He replaced Ahmed Ouyahia as Prime Minister.

Sellal stepped down in March 2014 in order to lead the re-election campaign of the ailing President Bouteflika. After Bouteflika's victory, he reappointed Sellal as Prime Minister on 28 April 2014.

In June 2019, Sellal was remanded in custody by the country's supreme court as part of an anti-corruption investigation.

In December 2019, he was sentenced to 15 years in jail.

In March 2020, an appeals court upheld his sentence.

In February 2022, Abdelmalek Sellal was hospitalized at the CHU Mustapha-Pacha in Algiers for contamination with the Omicron variant of covid-19 and had health problems related to the latter.

See also
Cabinet of Algeria

References

External links

 
|-
 

1948 births
Algerian Muslims
Ambassadors of Algeria to Hungary
Government ministers of Algeria
Foreign ministers of Algeria
Interior ministers of Algeria
Public works ministers of Algeria
Sports ministers of Algeria
Transport ministers of Algeria
Youth ministers of Algeria
Water ministers of Algeria
Living people
National Liberation Front (Algeria) politicians
People from Constantine, Algeria
Heads of government who were later imprisoned
21st-century Algerian people